The Sea Bat is a 1930 American pre-Code melodrama thriller film directed by Lionel Barrymore and Wesley Ruggles, starring Raquel Torres, Charles Bickford and featuring Boris Karloff. Part of the film was filmed on location in Mazatlán, Mexico. The film was originally intended as a vehicle for Lon Chaney, but he was too ill from throat cancer to undertake the project and died on August 26, 1930. The film concerns a community of sponge divers who are harassed by a large and hostile manta ray.

Cast
 Raquel Torres as Nina
 Charles Bickford as Reverend Sims
 Nils Asther as Carl
 George F. Marion as Antone
 John Miljan as Juan
 Boris Karloff as Corsican
 Gibson Gowland as Limey
 Edmund Breese as Maddocks
 Mathilde Comont as Mimba
 Mack Swain as Dutchy
 James Dime as the sailor

See also
 
 
 List of monster movies

References

External links

 
 
 
 

1930 films
1930 drama films
1930s thriller drama films
1930 adventure films
American adventure thriller films
American black-and-white films
American monster movies
American thriller drama films
Films directed by Lionel Barrymore 
Films directed by Wesley Ruggles 
Giant monster films
Metro-Goldwyn-Mayer films
Films with screenplays by Dorothy Yost
Films with screenplays by Bess Meredyth
Underwater action films
Melodrama films
1930s English-language films
1930s American films